Robert Kilpatrick, Baron Kilpatrick of Kincraig, CBE (29 July 1926 – 16 September 2015) was a British physician, educator, academician, and former President of the General Medical Council.

Life

Kilpatrick was educated at Buckhaven High School, and studied medicine at Edinburgh University, graduating in 1949 with a Bachelor of Surgery (Ch.B.).

Having suffered from tuberculosis when he was younger and been one of the first patients to be treated with the antibiotic streptomycin, Kilpatrick was a patron of the charity TB Alert.

He died in 2015 at the age of 89. He is buried in Dean Cemetery immediately to the south-west of the main entrance.

Career
He served as lecturer and dean at Sheffield, Leicester, Dundee and Edinburgh Universities.

Appointed a Commander of the Order of the British Empire (CBE) in 1979, he was knighted in 1986. Announced in the 1996 New Year Honours, he was created life peer as Baron Kilpatrick of Kincraig, of Dysart in the district of Kirkcaldy on 16 February 1996. He sat as a crossbencher.

Family

Kilpatrick married Elizabeth (Bette) Gibson Page Forbes (1927-2019) in 1950. The couple had two sons and a daughter.

Honours and arms
 Hon DUniv Edinburgh, 1987
 Hon LLD Univ of Dundee, 1992
 Hon DSc Univ of Hull, 1994
 Hon DSc Univ of Leicester, 1994
 Hon LLD Univ of Sheffield, 1995
 Hon FRCPath, 1994
 Hon FRCS, 1995
 Hon FRCP (Dublin), 1995
 Hon FRCSEd, 1996
 FRCPE, 1963
 FRCP, 1975
 FRCP (Glasgow), 1991
 FRSE, 1998

Sources
  Hansard reference
 Parliament.uk

References

1926 births
2015 deaths
Commanders of the Order of the British Empire
Crossbench life peers
People from Kirkcaldy
Academics of the University of Dundee
Academics of the University of Edinburgh
Academics of the University of Leicester
Academics of the University of Sheffield
Fellows of the Royal College of Physicians
Fellows of the Royal Society of Edinburgh
Place of birth missing
Knights Bachelor
Chairs of the General Medical Council
Life peers created by Elizabeth II